John Robert "Jackie" Howe (10 July 1861 – 21 July 1920) was a legendary Australian sheep shearer at the end of the 19th century.  He shot to fame in pre-Federation Australia in 1892 when he broke the daily and weekly shearing records across the colonies.

Howe was born at Killarney near Warwick, Queensland. On 10 October 1892, Howe had shorn 321 sheep in seven hours and 40 minutes at Alice Downs station, near Blackall, Queensland.  This was a faster tally than any other shearer had achieved before. In the week beforehand, Howe also set the weekly record, shearing 1,437 sheep in 44 hours and 30 minutes. Howe's daily record was beaten by Ted Reick in 1950, but Reick was using machine shears, while Howe's hand shears were little more than scissors.

According to the Australian Dictionary of Biography, Howe's weekly record stood unbeaten as of 2005.

In October 2015, Howe's record was reported as still unbeaten after 123 years.

Howe was active during the shearer strikes of the 1891 and 1894, and was a committed trade unionist. After Howe's death, Queensland Premier T. J. Ryan said, in a telegram to Howe's widow, "I have lost a true and trusted friend and Labor has lost a champion". Jackie Howe was the subject of a book, Jack Howe: The Man and the Legend, by Barry Muir, and a bronze statue, on display in Blackall.

Jackie Howe's father, Jack Howe, was also a shearer and a clown with La Rosier's circus, claiming to be the first clown to travel the Australian colonies, and was town-crier in Warwick. Jackie Howe owned a pub, The Barcoo Hotel, in Blackall, Queensland. There is now a statue there of him holding a sheep.

Clothing

Jackie Howe became the name given to navy blue singlet tops. According to legend, this is what Jackie was wearing on the day he broke the shearing record. They are still popular today among Australian men.

Notes

References 
 MacDougall, A. K., (2005), An Anthology of Classic Australian Folklore.
 Blackall-related publications, including Jack Howe on the Blackall Shire Council website. Accessed 29 April 2006.
 Blackall Ambassadors, includes list of Howe-related achievements of Barry Muir.  From Wanpa-rda Matilda Outback Education Centre website.  Accessed 29 April 2006.

1861 births
1920 deaths
Sheep shearers
People from Queensland